The Visualization Sutras (guan jing) are a group of Buddhist meditation texts which contain fantastic visual images and which mostly survive in Chinese translations dating from about the sixth century CE.

Overview
A main feature of these texts is the visual imagery used, though only some include actual meditation practices which use visualization. There is no consensus on a Sanskrit basis for the term "guan" and while the sutras present themselves as translations no Indic originals have been found. Scholars disagree on their origin, possibly Central Asia or China.

List of Visualization sutras
There are various sutras associated with this term, though generally six major texts as seen as the central visualization sutras as listed by Alexander Coburn Soper (1959).

Sutra on the Sea of Samādhi Attained through Contemplation of the Buddha (Guan Fo Sanmei Hai Jing), commonly known as Samādhi Sea Sutra. According to Yamabe, this is the oldest of the bunch.
Sutra on the Contemplation of the Buddha of Immeasurable Life (Guan Wuliangshoufo Jing), commonly known as Amitāyus Contemplation Sutra
Sutra on the Contemplation of the Two Bodhisattvas Bhaiṣajyarāja and Bhaiṣajyasamudgata (Guan Yaowang Yaoshang Erpusa Jing), commonly known as Bhaiṣajyarāja Contemplation Sutra
Sutra on the Contemplation of Maitreya Bodhisattva's Ascent to Rebirth in Tusita Heaven (Guan Mile Pusa Shangsheng Doushuaitian Jing), commonly known as Maitreya Contemplation Sutra
Sutra on the Contemplation of the Cultivation Methods of the Bodhisattva Samantabhadra (Guan Puxian Pusa Xingfa Jing), commonly known as Samantabhadra Contemplation Sutra
Sutra on the Contemplation of the Bodhisattva Ākāśagarbha (Guan Xukongzang Pusa Jing), commonly known as Ākāśagarbha Contemplation Sutra.

Nobuyoshi Yamabe notes that the following texts also have a similarity to the visualization sutras:

A manual on the Secret Essence of Meditation
The Secret Essential Methods to Cure the Diseases Caused by Meditation
The Essence of the Meditation Manual consisting of Five Gates
The Yogalehrbuch (Yoga textbook), an anonymous meditation manual in Sanskrit found at Kizil Caves. Yamabe notes that the visualization practices here are similar to the Sea of Samadhi sutra.

See also
 Dhyāna sutras
 Yogacara
 Anapanasati
 Sarvastivada

References

Other sources
Ponampon, Phra Kiattisak. "Dunhuang Manuscript S.2585: a Textual and Interdisciplinary Study on Early Medieval Chinese Buddhist Meditative Techniques and Visionary Experiences." MPhil Diss., University of Cambridge, 2019. 
Soper, Alexander Coburn. Literary Evidence for Early Buddhist Art in China. Artibus Asiae Supplementum 19. Ascona, Switzerland: Artibus Asiae, 1959.
Fujita Kōtatsu (藤田 宏達). “The Textual Origins of the Kuan Wu-Liang-Shou Ching: A Canonical Scripture of Pure Land Buddhism.” Translated by Kenneth K. Tanaka. In Chinese Buddhist Apocrypha''. Edited by Robert E. Buswell Jr., 149–173. Honolulu: University of Hawai‘i Press, 1990.
Yamabe, Nobuyoshi. “The Sūtra on the Ocean-Like Samādhi of the Visualization of the Buddha: The Interfusion of the Chinese and Indian Cultures in Central Asia as Reflected in a Fifth Century Apocryphal Sūtra.” PhD diss., Yale University, 1999.
Yamabe, Nobuyoshi. The significance of the "Yogalehrbuch" for the Investigation into the Origin of Chinese Meditation Texts, Buddhist Culture, The institute of Buddhist Culture, Kyushu Ryukoku Junior College

Early Buddhist texts
Chinese Buddhist texts